Kelli Masters is an American sports agent and lawyer. She was the first woman to represent an NFL draft pick.

Biography 
Masters was born in Oklahoma City and raised in Tahlequah. She is a member of the Cherokee Nation. After graduating from Midwest City High School in 1991, she studied law at Oklahoma University.

While studying at Oklahoma University, Masters also competed as a baton twirler and beauty queen. She won the title of Miss Oklahoma in 1997, and later competed in the Miss America pageant. Masters became the first woman to represent an NFL draft pick after signing Gerald McCoy in 2010. Masters later said that she faced sexism as a woman in the industry, and has spoken about the obstacles facing women in the NFL. She had initially been discouraged from entering the field by male colleagues. In 2014, Bleacher Report named Masters as one of the 25 Most Powerful Women in Sports.
In 2021, Masters published the autobiographical book High Impact Life.

References 

American sports agents
Cherokee Nation lawyers
Cherokee Nation sportspeople
Sportspeople from Oklahoma City
Living people
Year of birth missing (living people)
University of Oklahoma alumni
Native American sportswomen